Mein Schiff 3 is a cruise ship owned by TUI Cruises. She was delivered from STX Finland Turku Shipyard on 22 May 2014 and was followed by identical sister ships, Mein Schiff 4 in 2015, Mein Schiff 5 in 2016, Mein Schiff 6 in 2017.

History

Construction 
On 27 September 2011, TUI Cruises ordered a  cruise ship from STX Finland Turku shipyard with delivery date set in 2014. The contract also included an option for an identical sister vessel, which was confirmed on 5 November 2012. According to TUI Cruises, the new ships would set a new environmental friendliness standard for the cruise line and feature a number of new technologies to improve the fuel efficiency.

In late 2012, STX Finland was bidding for the construction of the third Oasis-class cruise ship for Royal Caribbean International in Turku shipyard and the funding of the two cruise ships for TUI Cruises was tied to this contract due to the difficult financial situation of the Finnish shipbuilder. However, after the shipyard failed to obtain a 50 million euro emergency loan from the Finnish Government and the contract for the world's largest cruise ship was awarded to STX France, there was a danger that the Turku shipyard could face bankruptcy unless it could quickly re-negotiate funding for the vessels, the first of which had been laid down on 12 December 2012 under the name "Newbuilding 1383". By February 2013, the financial crisis appeared to be over after STX Finland was awarded 31 million euro in the form of "innovation aid" from the Finnish Government and the city of Turku purchased the land where the shipyard was located for 23.5 million euro. The South Korean parent company, STX Offshore & Shipbuilding, would also participate in the funding and the client, TUI Cruises, agreed on more flexible payments. However, due to the looming liquidity crisis of STX Corporation later in the spring, the funding of the newbuildings as well as the future of the whole shipyard seemed again uncertain. The crisis was finally solved when STX Finland sold its shares of Aker Arctic Technology Inc to the state-owned Finnish Industry Investment for 9.3 million euro in December 2013.

The ship was launched on 8 November 2013 and officially christened Mein Schiff 3, German for "my ship". On 22 April 2014, she left for the first and, due to the tight production schedule, only sea trials. Mein Schiff 3 was handed over to TUI Cruises on 22 May 2014. She will be followed by Mein Schiff 4, which is scheduled to be launched in September 2014 and delivered in 2015, Mein Schiff 5, which is scheduled to be launched in 2015 and delivered in 2016, and Mein Schiff 6, which is scheduled to be launched in 2016 and delivered in 2017.

On 26 June 2018 the ship suffered damages while docked in Honningsvåg. Due to strong winds the ship tore its mooring, and slammed into the docks. Cruiseskip har slitt seg ved kaia i Honningsvåg

Career

Mein Schiff 3 began her maiden voyage from Hamburg to Palma de Mallorca on 13 June 2014. During the summer of 2014, it will operate on the Mediterranean.

On 28 January 2018, Mein Schiff 3 became the first cruise ship to visit Dominica since Hurricane Maria.

Reparation
During 1 April until 2 June, Mein Schiff fit one additional stern thruster between frames 26 and 33, in Navantia Cadiz dry-dock 9 days and the rest during operational navigation.

Incidents

Coronavirus pandemic
On 1 May 2020, TUI Cruises confirmed that a crew member aboard their ship Mein Schiff 3 tested positive for Covid-19. The company claimed that the last contact the crew had with the outside world was on 23 March 2020, after the last passengers had disembarked.

At the time of testing, the ship was located at Cuxhaven, Germany, with 2,899 TUI personnel aboard. Crew members aboard Mein Schiff 3 have strongly complained about the mismanagement and general cluelessness of the management, and about the difficulty to isolate on such a crowded ship. It has also been pointed out that TUI Cruises' statement contained factual inaccuracies. The rest of the tests were processed by 6 May 2020, at which point a total of 9 positive cases had been found.

Notes

References 

Cruise ships
2013 ships
Ships built in Turku